AudioSim is a virtual analog software synthesizer. It was released in 1996 by the German-Hungarian software company Audio Simulation. It was first available for DOS and supported SoundBlaster or Gravis Ultrasound Sound cards.

Description 

AudioSim contains 2 oscillators, 4 envelope generators, 2 LFOs and a self oscillating multimode filter. The parameters of the different modules are adjustable in real-time via the GUI using the mouse. The program also has MIDI support for Gravis Ultrasound and SoundBlaster cards.

Version 2.0 

 MIDI support for Sound Blaster cards
 Additional MIDI card support for use when using a buggy Sound Blaster MIDI
 Additional SINE waveform & PORTAMENTO to achieve more vintage sound
 Ring modulator usable parallel with synchronization and FM modulation
 Echo FX engine with delay & decay time

See also 

 Software synthesizer

References

External links 
 Audio Simulation web site
 AudioSim Information and demo version download
 
 

Software synthesizers